Tenka may refer to:
 Tenka (river), a river in Russia
 Tenka (kaika), a mysterious fire from folklore that signals a conflagration
 Tenka (wasp), a genus of Fig wasp
 The Japanese rendering of the sinoxenic term Tianxia (天下)
 A Japanese morning drama which aired from March to September 2004 on NHK
 Lifeforce Tenka, a video game